Events in the year 1954 in Belgium.

Incumbents
Monarch – Baudouin
Prime Minister – Jean Van Houtte (to 23 April); Achille Van Acker (from 23 April)

Events
April
 11 April – general election reduces Christian Social Party majority
 23 April – Socialist-Liberal coalition under Achille Van Acker takes office

August
 29-30 August – Minister of Education Léo Collard sacks 110 school teachers with teaching qualifications from Catholic institutions

September
 13-18 September – Tenth Solvay Conference on Physics held in Brussels, chaired by Lawrence Bragg

October
 23 October – Paris Protocol agreed, transforming the Brussels Pact into the Western European Union (with Germany and Italy joining).

Publications
 Hergé, Explorers on the Moon, Tintin album (serialised 1952–1953)
 Georges Simenon, Maigret à l'école and Maigret et la Jeune Morte

Art and architecture
 René Magritte, L'Empire des lumières

Births
 8 March – Daniel Ducarme, politician (died 2010)
 10 March – Luc Dardenne, film-maker
 12 April – Steve Stevaert politician (died 2015)
 7 May – Philippe Geluck, comedian and cartoonist

Deaths
 17 March – Victor Rousseau (born 1865), sculptor
 18 April – Denis Verschueren (born 1897), cyclist
 18 June – André Benoit (born 1900), cyclist
 5 October – Flor Alpaerts (born 1876), composer

References

 
1950s in Belgium
Belgium
Years of the 20th century in Belgium
Belgium